Castelleone (locally ) is a comune (municipality) in the Province of Cremona in the Italian region of Lombardy, located about  southeast of Milan and about  northwest of Cremona.

Castelleone borders the following municipalities: Cappella Cantone, Fiesco, Gombito, Izano, Madignano, Ripalta Arpina, San Bassano, Soresina, Trigolo.

Main sights
Sanctuary of Santa Maria della Misericordia, built in 1513-1516 by Agostino de Fondulis in Renaissance style. 
Church of Santa Maria in Bressanoro, commissioned in the 15th century by Bianca Maria Visconti. It has Renaissance frescoes of the Life of Jesus
Parish church of St. Philip and James (1551), with a Renaissance-style exteriori and a Baroque exterior.
Isso Tower (11th century)

Transportation 
Castelleone has a railway station on the Treviglio–Cremona line.

References

Cities and towns in Lombardy